Doiwala is a town and a Nagar Palika in Dehradun district  in the state of Uttarakhand, India.

Geography
It has an average elevation of 485 metres (1,591 feet). The place comes under Doon Valley's Terai and Bhabhar region. It is notable for its location near the center of the triangle formed by the three important metropolitan and cultural regions of Uttarakhand - Dehradun, Haridwar and Rishikesh, all three regions being within an hour's drive of the town.

Demographics
Doiwala Nagar Panchayat had a population of 8709 as per 2011, its administrative reach being the 1791 houses in the region. Males constitute 53.5% of the population and females 46.5%, giving the town a sex ratio of 869, significantly below the national average. Doiwala has an average literacy rate of 90.1%, higher than the national average of 74.4%: male literacy is 93.8% and, female literacy is 85.8%. In Doiwala, 10.8% of the population is under 6 years of age.

Government and politics 
Doiwala is an urban town which is administered by a nagar panchayat at the local level. It is divided into 21 wards, each of which has a locally elected councillor.

Schools, Colleges and Institutions
Radiant Public School (CBSE New Delhi)
Canterbury Bells School (CBSE New Delhi) 
 Dehradun Hills Academy (CBSE, New Delhi Estd. 1990)
DRL Memorial Academy, Hanshuwala (est. 2008)  
Shri Guru Ram Rai Public School
Holy Angel Sen. Sec. School (CBSE New Delhi)
The Presidency International School
Nancy International School
Doon Public School
 Swami Rama Himalayan University
Shri Guru Harkishan Academy
Melvin John's School
Doon Ghati College
Dental college
Public inter college
The Horizon School (CBSE New Delhi)
Mount Lietra Zee School (CBSE New Delhi)
Cosmic Education Centre
Ahilya Bai Holker Smriti Vidhyalaya (est. 1997)
Shaheed Durgamall Govt PG Degree College, Doiwala (est.2001)
Param Himalaya Homoeopathic Medical College, Doiwala

Religious composition of population
Hindus make up 80.2% of the population, followed by Muslims at 10.1% and Sikhs at 9.1%. Being a part of Dehradun district, Garhwali population is widespread in the nearby town Bhaniyawala, where many of the residents of the old Tehri city were relocated to. Nearby villages like Nunawala, Sherghar, Jhabrawala, Kheri, Bulawala, Chandmari follow mostly Sikhism. Major Indian festivals like Diwali, Eid, Republic and Independence Day, Holi, Vijaydashmi, Gurpurab are celebrated with delight in the region. Other local festivals include the famous Jhanda Mela, Lohri, Guru Gobind Jayanti, Baisakhi, Guru Arjan Sahib ji Shaheedi Divas, Guru Granth Sahib ji first Parkash Purab Divas and Chotey Sahibzade Shaheedi Divas. Popular Western celebrations like Christmas, Valentine's Day, New Year's Eve etc have also found acceptance in the area and are celebrated with glee. Ravidassis are also spread throughout the town.

Climate
The climate of Doiwala is generally temperate, although it varies from tropical in summers to severely cold, depending upon the season and the altitude of the specific location. Doiwala is rarely known to fall below 0 °C(32 °F). Summer temperatures can reach as high as 43 °C(109.4 °F) whereas winter temperatures can fall as low as −0.5 °C(31.5 °F). During the monsoon season, there is often heavy and protracted rainfall. Doiwala and other plains areas of Uttarakhand see almost as much rainfall as Coastal Maharashtra and Assam. The weather is considered to be good during winter in the hilly regions but it is often hot in the "Doon" valley. Agriculture benefits from fertile alluvial soil, adequate drainage and plentiful rain. Mountain areas are also used for agriculture.

Languages
Garhwali, Kumaoni, Punjabi and Hindi are the major spoken and native languages in Doiwala and nearby villages. Urdu and English are also quite prevalent. Administratively, English and Hindi are the two most common languages. Due to the high number of schools near the region, foreign languages like French are also gathering some traction, but currently count trace amounts of fluent speakers. In the past decade, a penchant for classical revivalism has also meant that Sanskrit is getting popular in many schools, but like French, counts almost no fluent speakers.

Notable locations
Ashirwad Vatika
Rajaji National Park
 Fun Valley
Picnic Spot, Lachhiwala
Doodhli
Gurdwara Shaheedi Chotey Sahibzade, Nunawala, National Highway 72
Gurdwara Shri Guru Singh Sabha, Near railway station
Gurdwara Guru Nanak Langar Hall, On National Highway 72
Shakti bhawan mandir
Sai Mandir
Mosque
Jolly Grant Airport, 5 Km from Doiwala
Himalayan hospital
Shed Hospital
Government Hospital
Sugar Mill Factory
Sharda farm, 1.5 km from Doiwala chock.
DRL Memorial Academy, Near Sharda Farm
Punjab National Bank, State Bank of India, Almora co-operative Bank ltd. & Bank of Baroda on sugar mill road.
Punjab and Sindh Bank, Nainital Bank & IDBI Bank on National Highway 72.
Oriental Bank of commerce, Co-operative Bank & Gramin Bank
Lal Tappar industrial area
Rambagh, Chandmari
Canara Bank in Doiwala, Haridwar Road.
State Bank of India near Himalayan Hospital.

References 

Cities and towns in Dehradun district